The 2021 F4 Danish Championship season was the fifth season of the F4 Danish Championship. The season began at Padborg Park in May and concluded at Jyllandsringen in October.

Mads Hoe became the drivers' champion, having driven for his own team in F5 machinery.

Teams and drivers

Calendar 
The first provisional calendar consisting of 5 rounds was published on 16 November 2020. The next 2 competitions were announced on 2 December 2020. The planned opening round at Padborg Park on 24–25 April was postponed to 15–16 May due to the pandemic restrictions and economic reasons. The round at Sturup Raceway was cancelled due to the travel restrictions between Denmark and Sweden.

Race results

Championship standings 
Points are awarded to the top 10 classified finishers in each race. No points are awarded for pole position or fastest lap.

Drivers' standings 

 † – Driver did not finish the race, but was classified as they completed over 75% of the race distance.

Notes

References

External links 

 

F4 Danish Championship
Danish F4 Championship
F4 Danish Championship seasons
Danish